The West Gyalrongic languages constitute a group of Gyalrongic languages. On the basis of both morphological and lexical evidence, Lai et al. (2020) add the extinct Tangut language to West Gyalrongic.

Khroskyabs (formerly known as Lavrung)
Horpa (or Stau)
✝ Tangut

History
Sagart et al. (2019) estimate that West and East Gyalrongic had diverged from each other about 3,000 years before present.

Although Tangut is most commonly associated with Yinchuan, the capital of the Tangut Empire, Zhoushan (周山, Zhōushān) in Jinchuan County (Chinese: 金川縣 Jīnchuān Xiàn, Written Tibetan: Chuchen; roughly located between the territories of Khroskyabs and Situ speakers today) had a historically attested population of Tangut people in 945 AD. As a result, based on both historiographical and linguistic evidence, Lai et al. (2020) place the ultimate homeland of the Tangut in present-day western Sichuan.

References

Guillaume Jacques; Yunfan Lai; Anton Antonov; Lobsang Nima. 2017. "Stau (Ergong, Horpa)." In Graham Thurgood and Randy J. LaPolla (eds.), The Sino-Tibetan Languages, 597-613. London & New York: Routledge.

Qiangic languages